Toronto Azzurri Blizzard was a Canadian women's semi-professional soccer club based in Toronto, Ontario that competed in the women's division League1 Ontario.  The club was formed as a partnership between two local area clubs - Toronto Blizzard SC and Toronto Azzurri SC.

History
The club was founded in 2017 as a joint partnership between Toronto clubs Toronto Blizzard SC and Toronto Azzurri SC. The Toronto Blizzard SC was a re-formed club from the original club of the same name that played professionally in the NASL. They played their home matches at Azzurri Village in North York.

The club joined the women's division of League1 Ontario for the 2017 season. They played their first match against Sanjaxx Lions, losing 1–0. After a 2018 season in which they lost every game of the season, they left the league following the 2018 season.

Seasons 
Women

Notable former players
The following players have either played at the professional or international level, either before or after playing for the League1 Ontario team:

References

Soccer clubs in Ontario
League1 Ontario teams
Toronto Blizzard
Association football clubs established in 2017
2017 establishments in Ontario
Women's soccer clubs in Canada